Rajya Sabha elections were held in India in 2015 to elect eight members of the Rajya Sabha, the upper house of the Indian Parliament. Five by-elections were also held. The regular elections were held to fill seats in the States of Jammu and Kashmir, Kerala, and the Union Territory of Pondicherry.

Jammu and Kashmir
Jammu and Kashmir had an election on 7 February 2015.

Kerala
Kerala was supposed to have an election on 16 April 2015. But, the election was postponed to 20 April.

Pondicherry
Pondicherry held the election on 28 September 2015 to elect one Member of Parliament.

Bye elections
The following bye-elections were also held in 2015.

 The bye elections were announced to be held on 20 March to fill the vacancy caused by death of Murli Deora representing Maharashtra, resignation of Srinjoy Bose representing West Bengal and death of Manorama Dobriyal Sharma from Uttarakhand. Three new members were elected unopposed on 14 March 2015, for the vacancy Amar Shankar Sable with the term till 2 April 2020, Dola Sen with the term till 18 August 2017 and Raj Babbar with the term till 25 November 2020 respectively.
 The bye election was held on 2 July, to fill the vacancy caused by resignation of Kanwar Deep Singh representing Jharkhand. M. J. Akbar of BJP won the election after defeating Haji Hussain Ansari of the JMM and got the term till 29 June 2016.
 The bye elections were announced to be held on 14 December to fill the vacancy caused by death of Kalpataru Das representing Odisha. Narendra Kumar Swain  was elected unopposed on 7 December 2015, with the term till 2 April 2020.

References

2015 elections in India
2015